Mark Springer is a British pianist and composer. Springer first came to public attention in the group Rip Rig and Panic. This group also featured the singer Neneh Cherry and Sean Oliver and Gareth Sager and Bruce Smith. Here he explored what was to be the start of his piano performances and compositions. Springer has composed for piano and string quartet and opera and other ensembles. He owns his own record label.

Biography
Mark Springer first began playing gigs with the experimental rock band The Pop Group, the group's members had been  Springer's schoolmates. In 1981, Springer formed Rip Rig + Panic with Gareth Sager and Bruce Smith, two former members of Pop Group. After Rip Rig + Panic disbanded in 1983, Springer began recording as a solo artist. His debut album titled Piano was released in 1984 and comprised numerous solo piano recordings.

Discography 
With Rip Rig + Panic
God (1981)
I Am Cold (1982)
Attitude (1983)
Circa Rip Rig + Panic (2017)  Recorded by Mark Springer and members of Rip Rig + Panic with singer from Velvet Underground, Nico.

As a solo artist
Piano (1984)
Swans And Turtles (with Sarah Sarhandi, 1990)
Menu (1991)
Eye (1998)
Capture (1999)
Nature/Music/Food/The Stars and The Planets  -  Featuring the drummer from Portishead, Clive Deamer. (2000)
Metonic: Music for Solo Piano & Piano Quartet (2002)
Solo Situation (2004)
E.T.A. N.Y.C.: Jazz Standards and Original Compositions (2005)
Diving (2018)
Menu 2 (2016)
The Watching Bird (2017)
The Rip Rig + Panic Piano Solos (2018)

Collaborations

Aparat - Duo with Mark Springer and Arthur Jeffes of Penguin Cafe (2016)
First Light by the Pax Trio with Mark Springer, David Wright and Sirish Kumar (2009)
Triptych by the Pax Trio with Mark Springer, David Wright and Sirish Kumar (2006)

Original music score compositions

 Weekend - Feature film Weekend by Barnaby Southcombe
 London Kills Me - Feature film by Hanish Kureishi
 Moll Flanders - Granada 4 Part TV series
 The fall Out Guy - BBC drama, Produced by Paul Tickell
 The House - Film Short by Sam Hodgkin
 ITV Documentary on the-surrealist painter Leonora Carrington
 BBC Documentary film on Mark Springer and his father, the artist, Michael Springer
 Das Erde - Documentary for German TV
 Fatto a Mano - Film Short by S. Killery
 L’Amour Fou - French art house documentary
 The Potentino Concerto - Film Short by Agnieszka Biolik

References
General

 
 

Notes

Extended links

20th-century composers
20th-century English painters
English male painters
20th-century pianists
English punk rock singers
English jazz pianists
English rock pianists
Living people
Musicians from Bristol
Rip Rig + Panic members
20th-century English musicians
Year of birth missing (living people)